Park Hee-jin (born June 4, 1973) is a South Korean actress, model, comedian, television host, and singer. She is known for her roles in the shows Partners for Justice, Sweet Revenge 2 and Melting Me Softly. She also did roles in the movies Marrying the Mafia II and Marrying the Mafia III.

Life and career
Park Hee-jin is a South Korean actress born on June 4, 1973, in Gyeonggi-do, South Korea. She first made her debut as an actress in the movie A Promise in 1998. She then appeared in TV dramas such as Partners for Justice, Sweet Revenge 2 and Melting Me Softly. She also appeared in several movies, including Marrying the Mafia II, A Little Pond and Marrying the Mafia III.

Filmography

Television

Film

Album
I need a fairy part 3
I need a fairy part 5

Awards and nominations
 2000 MBC Comedy Awards Rookie Award
 2003 Traffic Broadcasting MC Division Excellence Award
 2005 41st Baeksang Arts Awards TV Female Entertainment Awards
 2005 MBC Broadcasting Entertainment Awards, Comedy Sitcom Award,
 2005 12th Korea Entertainment Art Awards, Comedy Award
 2005 The 12th Korea Entertainment Art Awards
 2005 32nd Korean Broadcasting Awards Comedian Individual Award
 2005 MBC Broadcasting Entertainment Awards, Comedy/Sitcom Female Grand Prize

References

External links
 
 

1973 births
Living people
21st-century South Korean actresses
South Korean female models
South Korean television actresses
South Korean film actresses